To Russia with Love may refer to:

 To Russia with Love (film)
 To Russia with Love (album)